Mark Roper (born 16 March 1958) is a South African writer and film director. He worked mainly as assistant director on more than forty films since 1984.

Selected filmography
Project Shadowchaser IV (1996)
Death, Deceit and Destiny Aboard the Orient Express (2000)
Marines (2003)

References

External links 

1958 births
Living people
People from Johannesburg
South African film directors